Mumbai CSMT - Patna Suvidha Express is a Passenger express train of the Indian Railways connecting Chhatrapati Shivaji Maharaj Terminus railway station in Maharashtra and Patna Junction in Bihar. It is currently being operated with 82355/82356 train numbers on a twice week.

Service

It averages 64 km/h as 82356 Mumbai CST - Patna Suvidha Express starts on Sunday and Wednesday and covers 1705.5 km in 26 h 35 min & 66 km/h as 82355 Patna - Mumbai CST Suvidha Express and covers 1705.5 km in 25 h 45 min.

Coach composite

The train consists of 16 coaches:
 1 AC II Tier
 4 AC III Tier
 8 Sleeper Coaches
 2 Second-class Luggage/parcel van
 1 pantry car

See also

References 
82355/Patna - Mumbai CST Suvidha Superfast Express
82356/Mumbai CST - Patna Suvidha Express

Rail transport in Bihar
Rail transport in Madhya Pradesh
Rail transport in Maharashtra
Transport in Patna
Transport in Mumbai
Suvidha Express trains